C.F. Mott Training College or C.F. Mott Teachers' Training College or City of Liverpool C.F. Mott Training College was a college located in near Huyton on Merseyside.

The college was named after Charles Francis Mott who was the Director of Education in Liverpool from 1922 to 1945.

It became an affiliate college of Lancaster University, offering a programme of arts and science degrees which were conferred in the annual ceremony at Lancaster University.

Notable alumni include the actress and comedian Caroline Aherne, rock musician Julian Cope and Radiohead drummer Philip Selway.

It was absorbed into Liverpool Polytechnic by 1987.

The original site has now being redeveloped as Kings Business Park, retaining only The Hazels, a Grade II listed 1764 building.

References

Teacher training colleges in the United Kingdom
Defunct universities and colleges in England
Education in Merseyside
Educational institutions disestablished in 1970
1970 disestablishments in England